Air Chief Marshal Sir George Holroyd Mills,  (26 March 1902 – 14 April 1971) was a senior Royal Air Force commander. After his retirement from the RAF, Mills served as Black Rod in the Houses of Parliament until 1970. He was also a trustee of the Imperial War Museum.

RAF career
Mills joined the RAF College at Cranwell as a cadet in 1920 and became one of the earliest graduates of the newly formed College. After graduating he spent a short time at the RAF Depot. Mills was then posted to Mesopotamia flying DH 9As with No. 8 Squadron. He transferred to No. 100 Squadron in 1927 flying Hawker Horsley
aircraft. He attended the RAF Staff College in 1935.

He served in the Second World War taking up command of No. 115 Squadron in late 1939 and then joining the Air Staff at Headquarters Bomber Command before becoming Station Commander at RAF Watton. He was appointed Director of Policy (General) at the Air Ministry in September 1943 and Air Officer Commanding Balkan Air Force in February 1945.

After the War he was appointed Director of Plans at the Air Ministry in 1946, Air Officer Commanding No. 1 Group in 1949 and Air Officer Commanding Air Headquarters Malaya in 1952. He went on to be  Air Officer Commander-in-Chief Bomber Command in April 1953, Commander Allied Air Forces Central Europe in January 1956 and Chairman of the British Joint Services Mission to Washington, D.C. and UK Representative on the NATO Standing Group in July 1959.

He retired from the Royal Air Force on 18 September 1962.

In retirement he served as Gentleman Usher of the Black Rod in the Houses of Parliament.

His children included Air Marshal Sir Nigel Mills.

Honours and awards
Distinguished Flying Cross (DFC) – 31 May 1940
Companion of the Order of the Bath (CB) – 14 June 1945
Knight Commander of the Order of the Bath (KCB) – 1 January 1954
Knight Grand Cross of the Order of the Bath (GCB) – 1 January 1959

References

 

|-

|-

|-

|-

1902 births
1971 deaths
People from Dartford
Knights Grand Cross of the Order of the Bath
Recipients of the Distinguished Flying Cross (United Kingdom)
Royal Air Force air marshals
Graduates of the Royal Air Force College Cranwell
Ushers of the Black Rod
British air attachés
Military personnel from Kent